Gustaf Kossinna (28 September 1858 – 20 December 1931) was a German philologist and archaeologist who was Professor of German Archaeology at the University of Berlin.

Along with Carl Schuchhardt he was the most influential German prehistorian of his day, and was creator of the techniques of settlement archaeology. His nationalistic theories about the origins of the Germanic peoples and Indo-Europeans influenced aspects of National Socialist ideology. Though politically discredited after World War II, Kossinna's methodological approach has greatly influenced archaeology up to the present day.

In the years following World War II, Kossinna's theories of settlement archaeology were widely dismissed as pseudoscience. Recent discoveries in archaeogenetics have prompted a renewed discussion of Kossinna's legacy and the significance of migration in prehistory.

Life
Kossinna was a Germanized Mazur He was born in Tilsit, East Prussia, Kingdom of Prussia. His father was a teacher at the secondary-school level. Kossinna attended the Königliche Litthauische Provinzialschule in Tilsit. As a child he learned Latin and piano.

As a university student he matriculated at a number of universities, studying classical and then Germanic philology in the universities of Göttingen, Leipzig, Berlin and Strasbourg. He also studied German history, local history and art history. Kossinna was influenced greatly by Karl Müllenhoff, who encouraged him to research the origins of Indo-European and Germanic culture. He also came under the influence of Otto Tischler and Friedrich Ratzel.

Kossinna obtained his doctorate at Strasbourg in 1887 in the subject of the early records of the high-Frankish language. From 1888 to 1892 he worked as a librarian. During this time Kossinna read widely and published a number of scientific papers on the ancient history of Germany. In 1896 his ideas were expressed in his lecture "The Pre-Historical Origins of the Teutons in Germany".

In 1902, Kossinna was appointed Professor of German Archaeology at the University of Berlin. This position was exclusively created for him. While in this capacity, Kossinna began the work of systematically building up the university institute in view of improving its study and teaching of prehistoric archaeology.

Throughout his career, Kossinna published many books on the origins of the Germanic peoples, founding the "German Prehistory Society" to promote interest and research in the subject. He became the most famous archaeologist in the German-speaking world, and was notable for his use of archaeology to promote claims for an expanded German nation. Notably, Kossinna only conducted one excavation during his career, in 1915. The bulk of his work relied on evidence from the reports of colleagues and museum artifacts.

Ideas

By 1895, Kossinna had developed theory that a regionally delimited ethnicity can be defined by the material culture excavated from a site (culture-historical archaeology or simply culture history theory). He wrote, "Sharply defined archaeological cultural areas correspond unquestionably with the areas of particular people or tribes". The statement is known as "Kossinna's law" and forms the basis of his "settlement-archaeology" method. Unlike modern settlement archaeology, which refers only to individual settlements or patterns of settlement, Kossinna meant to emphasise, in Arvidsson's words, that "a unified set of archaeological artifacts, a 'culture', was the sign of a unified ethnicity."

Kossinna's ideas have been connected to the claim that Germanic peoples constitute a national identity with a historic right to the lands they once occupied, providing an excuse for later Nazi annexations of lands in Poland and Czechoslovakia. For example, in his article "The German Ostmark, Home Territory of the Germans", Kossinna argued that Poland should be a part of the German empire. According to him, lands where artifacts had been found that he considered to be Germanic were part of ancient Germanic territory.

In 1902, Kossinna identified the Proto-Indo-Europeans with the Corded Ware culture, an argument that gained in currency over the following two decades. According to Stefan Arvidsson, Kossinna placed the Proto-Indo-European homeland in Schleswig-Holstein. In studying the prehistory of the Germanic peoples and ancient Indo-Europeans, Kossinna saw the key to the unwritten prehistory of Europe.

Kossinna emphasised a diffusionist model of culture, according to which cultural evolution occurred by a "process whereby influences, ideas and models were passed on by more advanced peoples to the less advanced with which they came into contact." He emphasised that such superiority was racial in character. Kossinna’s theories aimed to present a history of the Germanic peoples superior to that of the Roman Empire. He considered the Romans and the French as destroyers of culture as compared to the Germanic peoples. One of his best-known books was Die Deutsche Vorgeschichte - Eine Hervorragend Nationale Wissenschaft (German Prehistory: A Pre-Eminently National Discipline). It was dedicated "To the German people, as a building block in the reconstruction of the externally as well as internally disintegrated fatherland."

Legacy

Following his death, his followers held high-profile positions under the Nazi regime, including Hans Reinerth, who held Kossinna's former chair at the University of Berlin between 1934 and 1945, and his views were incorporated into the curriculum in German schools.

Kossinna's ideas have been heavily criticised partly because of the political use to which they were put, but also because of inherent ambiguities in the method. Problems with Kossinna's theories have been summarized by Hans Jürgen Eggers.

Despite justified criticism of the method and its application by Kossinna, the central technique was not unique to him, but it has also developed elsewhere in Europe and the US. Kossinna occupies a key role in the emergence of prehistory as an academic discipline. His methods influenced those of V. Gordon Childe, whose associates dominated the field of archaeology for decades after World War II.

In the years following World War II, particularly in the 1960s and 1970s, there was a counterreaction against Kossinna's theories of settlement archaeology, and the migration was generally considered not to have been a major factor in prehistoric culture change. More recently, studies of prehistoric migration through archaeogenetics have been described as marking a return of Kossinna's cultural-historical thinking, drawing criticism from archaeologists.

Selected works
 Über Die Ältesten Hochfränkischen Sprachdenkmäler: Ein Beitrag zur Grammatik des Althochdeutschen, 1888
 Die Indagermanische Frage, 1902
 Mannus, 1909
 Die Herkunft der Germanen: Zur Methode der Siedlungsarchäologie, 1911
 Der Goldfund von Messingwerk bei Eberswalde und Die Goldenen Kultgefäze Der Germanen, 1913
 Der Germanische Goldreichtum in Der Bronzezeit, 1913
 Die Deutsche Vorgeschichte: Eine Hervorragend Nationale Wissenschaft, 1914
 Das Weichselland: Ein Uralter Heimatboden Der Germanen, 1919
 Die Indogermanen, Ein Abriss, 1921
 Ursprung und Verbreitung der Germanen in Vor- und Frühgeschichtlicher Zeit, 1926
 Germanische Kultur Im 1. Jahrtausend Nach Christus, 1932
 Altgermanische Kulturhöhe: Eine Einführung in Die Deutsche Vor- und Frühgeschichte, 1937

See also

Culture history
Madison Grant
Lothrop Stoddard
Joseph Widney
Alfred Rosenberg
Hans F. K. Günther
William Z. Ripley
Carleton S. Coon
Houston Stewart Chamberlain
Harry H. Laughlin

Notes

References

Sources

Further reading

 
 
 
 
Heyd, V. (2017). Kossinna's smile. Antiquity, 91(356), 348-359. https://doi.org/10.15184/aqy.2017.2

External links
 

1858 births
1931 deaths
Alldeutscher Verband members
Aryanism
German archaeologists
German people of Slavic descent
German philologists
Germanic studies scholars
Germanists
Humboldt University of Berlin alumni
Academic staff of the Humboldt University of Berlin
Leipzig University alumni
Militant League for German Culture members
Nordicism
People from Tilsit
People from the Province of Prussia
Prehistorians
University of Göttingen alumni
University of Strasbourg alumni